Hind is both an English surname and an Arabic female given name. Notable people with the name include:

Surname:
 Alfred Hind (1878–1947), English cricketer and rugby union player
 Amos Hind (1849–1931), English cricketer
 Archie Hind (1928–2008), Scottish writer
 Arthur Hind (industrialist) (1856–1933), American industrialist and philatelist 
 Arthur Charles Hind (1904–?), Indian field hockey player
 Arthur Mayger Hind (1880–1957), curator at the British Museum and art historian
Billy Hind (1885–1963), English footballer
 Charles Hind (1827–1896), Dean of Ferns in the Church of Ireland
 C. Lewis Hind (1862–1927), British journalist, writer, editor, art critic and art historian
 Ella Cora Hind (1861–1942), Western Canada's first female journalist and a women's rights activist
 Henry Youle Hind (1823–1908), Canadian geologist and explorer
 James Hind (died 1652), English highwayman
 John Hind (disambiguation)
 Ken Hind (born 1949), British politician
 Natasha Hind (born 1989), New Zealand swimmer
 Rolf Hind (born 1964), British pianist and composer

Given name:
 Hind the wife of Amr, a sahaba (companion) of the Islamic prophet Muhammad
 Hind al-Husseini (1916–1994), Palestinian activist who founded an orphanage
 Hind bint Maktoum bin Juma Al Maktoum (born 1962), senior wife and consort of Sheikh Mohammed bin Rashid Al Maktoum, ruler of Dubai
 Hind bint Utbah, Arab woman who lived in the late 6th and early 7th centuries 
 Hind Dehiba (born 1979), Moroccan-French 1500 m runner
 Hind Khoury (born 1953), Palestinian economist
 Hind Laroussi (born 1984), Dutch singer
 Hind Rostom (1928–2011), Egyptian actress
 Hind bint Abi Umayya (596–683), the wife of Muhammad

Surnames from nicknames